-eaux is the standard French language plural form of nouns ending in -eau, e.g. eau → eaux, château → châteaux, gâteau → gâteaux.

In the United States, it often occurs as the ending of Cajun surnames, as well as a replacement for the long-O sound in some English words as a marker of Cajun, or more broadly Louisiana, identity.

American surnames

This is a common ending in the United States for historically Cajun surnames, such as Arceneaux, Babineaux, Boudreaux, Breaux, Busteaux, Laundreaux, Legeaux, Marceaux, Monceaux, Rabideaux, Robicheaux, Seaux, Thibodeaux, and Trabeaux. This combination of letters is pronounced with a long "O" sound.

United States spelling and use
Although there is debate about the exact emergence of this spelling in the United States, it has been claimed that the spelling originated from immigrants who did not speak or read English having to make an "x" mark at the end of their printed name in order to sign a legal document.  Since many Cajun names of French origin already ended in "-eau," the names' endings eventually became standardized as "-eaux."

This claim has been disputed by the historian Carl Brasseaux, who insists that the "-eaux" ending was one of many possible ways to standardize Cajun surnames ending in an "O" sound. Brasseaux claims that Judge Paul Briant is most responsible for the "-eaux" ending during his oversight of the 1820 U.S. Census in Louisiana and that the "x" ending is completely arbitrary. In addition, the counts of Pontchartrain and Maurepas spelled their surname "Phelypeaux", indicating that at least some literate settlers of Louisiana used that ending.

Several surnames end in -eau (the standard French spelling), especially surnames that start with "C", as in Cousineau, a common Cajun surname.

The "-eaux" ending is used among residents of Louisiana as a marker of Cajun (or more broadly Louisiana) heritage, particularly at sporting events for Louisiana State University, McNeese State University, Nicholls State University, the University of Louisiana at Lafayette, and the New Orleans Saints, typified as "Geaux Tigers", "Geaux Cowboys", "Geaux Colonels", "Geaux Cajuns", or "Geaux Saints" being pronounced as "Go Tigers", "Go Cowboys", "Go Colonels", "Go Cajuns", and "Go Saints". LSU trademarked the phrase "Geaux Tigers" in 2005.

However, in the French language, a letter "e" or "i" that immediately follows a "g" will cause the "g" to become soft. Therefore the pronunciation of "geaux" is actually /ʒo/, and not /go/. Preserving the hard g-sound would either require removing the "e" (resulting in "gaux") or inserting a silent "u" after "g" ("gueaux").

References

 
 

Eaux
Eaux
Eaux